Pishkeli Jan-e Bala (also Romanized as Pīshkelī Jān-e Bālā; also known as Peshgel Jān-e Bālā) is a village in Pir Kuh Rural District, Deylaman District, Siahkal County, Gilan Province, Iran. At the 2006 census, its population was 142, in 42 families.

References 

Populated places in Siahkal County